Jean-Roch Pédri, known as just Jean-Roch (born 3 October 1966 in Toulon, France), is a French singer-songwriter and DJ/producer of electronic music and the founder of "Vip Room".  He is also founder of the record label John-Roch Records.

Career
While young he aspired for a sports career as a football player, but at 16 had to fold his sports plans to help in the family restaurant business.

In 2004, he released his debut single "Can You Feel It" (Arrangement from Rocky OST - "Going the Distance"), in support of the French football team in Euro 2004 held in Portugal, followed by "God Bless Rock'n'Roll" as tribute to many rock legends. In 2008 took la Scala in Paris, transforming it into a Vip Room Theater, including 3000 sq. meters of space with a boutique selling Vip Room products, the bar Hysteria and the restaurant Le Gioia.

In 2010, Jean-Roch released the single "My Love Is Over" and in May 2011 "I'm Alright" in  collaboration with Kat DeLuna and Flo Rida from album Music Saved My Life, with further collaborations that included Snoop Dogg, Busta Rhymes, Pitbull, Fat Joe, Amerie, Fatman Scoop, Timati and Nayer.

In popular culture
In 2007, he hosted a summer show on Direct 8 television called Splash
In 2011, he took part in Les Anges Gardiens on NRJ12. The program sought to train assistants to artists helping them to develop a professional career.
The song "Can You Feel It" features prominently in the popular Chinese television show "If You Are the One".

Discography

Albums

Singles

References

External links
 Site Jean-Roch official website
 Vip Room website

1966 births
Living people
French male singers
French songwriters
Male songwriters
Musicians from Toulon
French people of Italian descent